Derwin Schlecker (born Derwin Dicker, 1980), professionally known as Gold Panda, is an English electronic record producer and songwriter.

Early life
Derwin Schlecker was born as Derwin Dicker in 1980 in Peckham, London and was raised in Chelmsford, Essex. He lived in Japan and studied at the School of Oriental and African Studies at the University of London.

Career
Gold Panda released several small-issue 7" records and singles in 2009, and in 2010 he signed with Ghostly International to release his debut full-length Lucky Shiner. In 2013, Gold Panda released his second album, Half of Where You Live.

On 27 May 2016, Gold Panda's third album, Good Luck and Do Your Best, was released via City Slang.

Gold Panda released a new single on 16 October 2020 titled Most Books That I've Never Read.

Derwin Dicker also performs house music as DJ Jenifa.

Discography

Studio albums
 Lucky Shiner (CD/12-inch, Ghostly International/Notown, Sept 2010)
 Companion (Ghostly International/Notown, March 22, 2011)
 Half of Where You Live (CD/12-inch, Ghostly/Notown, June 2013)
 Good Luck and Do Your Best (City Slang, May 2016)
 [As DJ Jenifa] Jag Trax (Self Released, March 2019)
 The Work (City Slang, Nov 11, 2022)

Extended plays
 Before (CDR, self-released, limited to 300 copies, 2009)
 Miyamae (12-inch, Various Production, July 2009)
 You (12-inch, Ghostly International, limited to 500 copies, June 2010)
 Snow & Taxis (12-inch, Ghostly, limited, Nov 2010)
 Marriage (12-inch, Ghostly, limited to 600 copies for Record Store Day, March 2011)
 DJ-Kicks: An Iceberg Hurled Northward Through Clouds (12-inch, Studio !K7, Oct 2011)
 Trust (12-inch, Notown, Feb 2013)
 The Dream (Spotify, 2022)

Singles
 "Quitter's Raga" (CDR/7-inch, Make Mine, limited to 500 copies, Aug 2009)
 "You" / "Before We Talked" (CDR/7-inch, Notown, 2010)
 "Mountain" / "Financial District" (7-inch, Ghostly/Notown, limited to 1200 copies, May 2012)
 "Brazil" (MP3, Ghostly, April 2013)
 "Transactional Relationship" (MP3, City Slang, August 2019)

Compilations/mixes
 Unreleased Medical Journal (CDR, self-released, limited, June 2010)
 Companion (CDR, self-released, limited, April 2010; CD, Ghostly, March 2011)
 Gold Panda: DJ-Kicks (DJ mix, CD/12-inch, Studio !K7, Oct 2011)

References

External links 

 Official site
 Gold Panda on Facebook

English record producers
Living people
1980 births
People from Peckham
People from Chelmsford
Alumni of SOAS University of London
Wichita Recordings artists